Kaya Adwoa Forson (born 19 March 2002) is a Ghanaian swimmer. She competed in the 200 metre freestyle and 200 metre backstroke at the 2015 World Championships in Kazan, Russia. Aged just 13, she was the youngest competitor at the World Championships. Forson lives in Málaga, Spain.

Forson represented Ghana in the 200 metre freestyle at the 2016 Summer Olympics in Rio de Janeiro, Brazil. Forson and male swimmer Abeiku Jackson, who competed in the 50 metre freestyle in Rio, became the first Ghanaians ever to compete in swimming at the Olympic Games.

Education 

Competitions 
 2016: Forson represented Ghana in the 200 metre freestyle at the 2016 Summer Olympics in Rio de Janeiro, Brazil.

Competition record

References

2002 births
Living people
Canadian people of Ghanaian descent
Canadian female swimmers
Ghanaian female swimmers
Olympic swimmers of Ghana
Swimmers at the 2016 Summer Olympics
Black Canadian sportspeople
Black Canadian sportswomen